Froude may refer to:

 Christine Froude (born 1947), Archdeacon of Malmesbury and Acting Archdeacon of Bristol
 Derek Froude (1959– ), New Zealand athlete
 Fred Froude (1910–1978), Australian rules footballer
 Hurrell Froude (1803–1836), Anglican priest
 James Anthony Froude (1818–1894), British historian
 William Froude (1810–1879), British engineer and hydrodynamicist

See also
 Froude, Saskatchewan - a small community in Canada
 Froude number